Bombay is a rural community in the Bombay Hills at the southern boundary of Auckland Region of New Zealand. The Auckland Southern Motorway runs through Bombay.

Bombay is named for the ship Bombay, which transported settlers from England to the area in 1863. At the beginning of the 20th century, a community of Indian New Zealanders also settled in the area. A Sikh temple was opened in 2004.

Demographics
Bombay is part of the larger Bombay Hills statistical area.

7010377 had a population of 660 at the 2018 New Zealand census, an increase of 198 people (42.9%) since the 2013 census, and an increase of 225 people (51.7%) since the 2006 census. There were 225 households, comprising 318 males and 345 females, giving a sex ratio of 0.92 males per female, with 141 people (21.4%) aged under 15 years, 99 (15.0%) aged 15 to 29, 315 (47.7%) aged 30 to 64, and 105 (15.9%) aged 65 or older.

Ethnicities were 85.0% European/Pākehā, 10.5% Māori, 4.1% Pacific peoples, 9.5% Asian, and 3.2% other ethnicities. People may identify with more than one ethnicity.

Although some people chose not to answer the census's question about religious affiliation, 53.6% had no religion, 35.5% were Christian, 3.2% were Hindu, 1.4% were Muslim, 0.9% were Buddhist and 0.9% had other religions.

Of those at least 15 years old, 78 (15.0%) people had a bachelor's or higher degree, and 87 (16.8%) people had no formal qualifications. 147 people (28.3%) earned over $70,000 compared to 17.2% nationally. The employment status of those at least 15 was that 276 (53.2%) people were employed full-time, 90 (17.3%) were part-time, and 12 (2.3%) were unemployed.

Education

References

Populated places in the Auckland Region